Scopula latimediata is a moth of the family Geometridae. It was described by David Stephen Fletcher in 1958. It is found in the Democratic Republic of the Congo and Uganda.

References

Moths described in 1958
latimediata
Moths of Africa